Nicola Brienza (born 25 January 1980) is an Italian basketball head coach who last managed Aquila Basket Trento in the Lega Basket Serie A (LBA) and EuroCup Basketball.

Career
Nicola Brienza started his coach-career managing the youth sector of Pallacanestro Cantù and in 2004 he became assistant coach of the club in Serie A until 2016, when he was named head coach for two matches in the interim between coaches Fabio Corbani and Sergei Bazarevich, starting with a home victory against Aquila Basket Trento. He remained as assistant coach to Sergei Bazarevich until the end of the season.

On 17 June 2016 he became head coach for the Swiss club Lugano Tigers in the Swiss Basketball League. Nicola lead the team to the third place in the league, only losing 3-2 against BBC Monthey in the semi-final.

On 12 July 2017 he came back to Italy as assistant coach for Orlandina Basket in Serie A.

On 12 June 2018 Brienza signed again an assistant coach for his first club Cantù until January 2019, when Evgeniy Pashutin resigned, he was named head coach of the club. With a 9-4 record, the team topped the second round chart after being in the bottom position after the first round, reaching the 7th place but being left out from playoffs due to head-to-head games record.

On 10 June 2019 Brienza was named new head coach of Aquila Basket Trento. In the 2019-2020 season, the team reached EuroCup Basketball Top 16 and was ranked seventh in the domestic league when the season was suspended due to COVID-19 pandemic. In the 2020-2021 season, Aquila Basket Trento qualified for the second year in a row for EuroCup Basketball Top 16, after winning the first six matches of the competition. Nonetheless, Brienza parted ways with Trento on 31 January 2021 after losing six matches in a row in the domestic league, leaving the team in eleventh position.

References

External links
Profile at legabasket.it 

1980 births
Living people
Italian basketball coaches
Pallacanestro Cantù coaches
Orlandina Basket coaches